Mohsin Shaikh (born 16 October 1987) is an Indian lyricist and composer who is part of the Javed - Mohsin musical duo for Indian films. He is known predominantly for his work as a music composer and lyricist in Hindi cinema.

Early life
Mohsin Shaikh was born in Mumbai to the writer Mustafa Shaikh and Safiya Shaikh.

Singer
 2020 - Suraj Pe Mangal Bhari ("Ladki Dramebaaz", "Dauda Dauda")

Composer (as Javed-Mohsin)

 2015 -  Kis Kisko Pyaar Karoon  (One song)
 2017 - Munna Michael (One song)
 2017 -  Julie 2 (One song)
 2018 - Jalebi (Two songs)
 2019 - Drive (Two songs)
 2020 - Suraj Pe Mangal Bhari (Five songs)
 2020 - Coolie No.1 (One song)
 2021 - Shershaah (Two songs)
 2022 - Nikamma (Two songs)

Lyricist
 2020 - "Sawan Mein Lag Gayi Aag"  - Ginny Weds Sunny (Composed by Payal Dev) 
 2022 - "Akdi Padki" - Liger (Composed by DJ Chetas - Lijo George, Sunil Kashyap)

References

External links
 Mohsin Shaikh on IMDB 
 Mohsin Shaikh on Cinestaan

Indian Muslims
Indian film score composers
Indian male film score composers
1987 births
Living people